Bastara is a village in Ujhani block, Budaun district, Uttar Pradesh, India. According to 2011 Census of India, the total population of the village is 810, out of 429 are males and 381 are females. Its village code is 128475.

References

Villages in Budaun district